Glen is an unincorporated village in the town of Bartlett in the White Mountains of New Hampshire.  The village is the home of Story Land, a popular amusement park in the Mount Washington Valley region, a resort area that also includes the communities of North Conway and Jackson.

Routes 302 and 16 travel north in a concurrency from North Conway and diverge in Glen. Route 16 continues north through Pinkham Notch to the communities of Gorham and Berlin, while Route 302 travels west through Crawford Notch towards western New Hampshire and into Vermont.

The village has a separate ZIP code (03838) from the rest of the town of Bartlett.

References

Unincorporated communities in New Hampshire
Unincorporated communities in Carroll County, New Hampshire
Bartlett, New Hampshire